Sultan Muhammad Mu'iz ud-din Iskander ibni al-Marhum Shah Ghazi al-Hasan 'Izz ud-din was the sultan of the Maldives from 1774–1779. He succeeded when his elder brother abdicated. Also known as Kalhu Banda'arain, he died in Malé on the 13 September 1779 and was succeeded by Hassan Nooraddeen I.

Early life 
Muizuddin was the second of two sons born to the Sultan. His older brother  Ghiyāṣ al-Dīn reigned in Ghowr, what is in present-day Afghanistan starting in 1762.

Reign 
Muizuddin ascended to the throne upon the departure of Ghiyāṣ al-Dīn. His reign was primarily spent at war, which involved his invasion of Multan and Uch as well as the annexation of the Ghaznavid principality (near modern day Lahore).

Death 
He was assassinated in 1779, though the origin of his assassins is still in dispute. Some scholars speculate that he was assassinated by Hindu Khokars while others link his death to the rival Delhi Sultanate.

See also 

 Maldives

References 

1779 deaths
18th-century sultans of the Maldives
Year of birth missing